The Scheveningen system is a method of organizing a chess match between two teams.  Each player on one team plays each player on the other team .  The team with the highest number of games won is the winner.  This system is a popular way to create title norm opportunities .

The system was first used in a tournament in Scheveningen, Netherlands in 1923.  The idea behind it was that a team of ten Dutch players could face ten foreign masters.  This has the intention of giving the players on the team experience against strong competition .

Standard Tables

Match on 2 Boards
Round 1 A1-B1 A2-B2
Round 2 B2-A1 B1-A2

Match on 3 Boards
Round 1 A1-B1 A2-B2 B3-A3
Round 2 B2-A1 A2-B3 B1-A3
Round 3 A1-B3 B1-A2 A3-B2

Match on 4 Boards
Round 1 A1-B1 A2-B2 B3-A3 B4-A4
Round 2 B2-A1 B1-A2 A3-B4 A4-B3
Round 3 A1-B3 A2-B4 B1-A3 B2-A4
Round 4 B4-A1 B3-A2 A3-B2 A4-B1

Match on 5 Boards
Round 1 A1-B1 A2-B2 A3-B3 B4-A4 B5-A5
Round 2 B2-A1 B3-A2 B4-A3 A4-B5 A5-B1
Round 3 A1-B3 A2-B4 B5-A3 B1-A4 A5-B2
Round 4 B4-A1 B5-A2 A3-B1 A4-B2 B3-A5
Round 5 A1-B5 B1-A2 B2-A3 A4-B3 A5-B4

Match on 6 Boards
Round 1 A1-B1 B2-A2 B3-A3 A4-B4 B5-A5 A6-B6
Round 2 B2-A1 A2-B3 A3-B5 B6-A4 A5-B4 B1-A6
Round 3 A1-B3 B5-A2 B1-A3 A4-B2 A5-B6 B4-A6
Round 4 B4-A1 B6-A2 A3-B2 A4-B1 B3-A5 A6-B5
Round 5 A1-B5 A2-B4 A3-B6 B3-A4 B1-A5 B2-A6
Round 6 B6-A1 A2-B1 B4-A3 B5-A4 A5-B2 A6-B3

Match on 7 Boards
Round 1 A1-B1 A2-B2 A3-B3 A4-B4 B5-A5 B6-A6 B7-A7
Round 2 B2-A1 B3-A2 B4-A3 A4-B5 A5-B6 A6-B7 B1-A7
Round 3 A1-B3 A2-B4 A3-B5 B6-A4 B7-A5 B1-A6 A7-B2
Round 4 B4-A1 B5-A2 A3-B6 A4-B7 A5-B1 B2-A6 B3-A7
Round 5 A1-B5 A2-B6 B7-A3 B1-A4 B2-A5 A6-B3 A7-B4
Round 6 B6-A1 A2-B7 A3-B1 A4-B2 B3-A5 B4-A6 B5-A7
Round 7 A1-B7 B1-A2 B2-A3 B3-A4 A5-B4 A6-B5 A7-B6

Match on 8 Boards
Round 1 A1-B1 A2-B2 A3-B3 A4-B4 B5-A5 B6-A6 B7-A7 B8-A8
Round 2 B2-A1 B3-A2 B4-A3 B1-A4 A5-B6 A6-B7 A7-B8 A8-B5
Round 3 A1-B3 A2-B4 A3-B1 A4-B2 B7-A5 B8-A6 B5-A7 B6-A8
Round 4 B4-A1 B1-A2 B2-A3 B3-A4 A5-B8 A6-B5 A7-B6 A8-B7
Round 5 A1-B5 A2-B6 A3-B7 A4-B8 B1-A5 B2-A6 B3-A7 B4-A8
Round 6 B6-A1 B7-A2 B8-A3 B5-A4 A5-B2 A6-B3 A7-B4 A8-B1
Round 7 A1-B7 A2-B8 A3-B5 A4-B6 B3-A5 B4-A6 B1-A7 B2-A8
Round 8 B8-A1 B5-A2 B6-A3 B7-A4 A5-B4 A6-B1 A7-B2 A8-B3

Match on 9 Boards
Round 1 A1-B1 A2-B2 A3-B3 A4-B4 A5-B5 B6-A6 B7-A7 B8-A8 B9-A9
Round 2 B2-A1 B3-A2 B4-A3 B5-A4 A5-B6 A6-B7 A7-B8 A8-B9 B1-A9
Round 3 A1-B3 A2-B4 A3-B5 A4-B6 B7-A5 B8-A6 B9-A7 B1-A8 A9-B2
Round 4 B4-A1 B5-A2 B6-A3 A4-B7 A5-B8 A6-B9 A7-B1 B2-A8 B3-A9
Round 5 A1-B5 A2-B6 A3-B7 B8-A4 B9-A5 B1-A6 B2-A7 A8-B3 A9-B4
Round 6 B6-A1 B7-A2 A3-B8 A4-B9 A5-B1 A6-B2 B3-A7 B4-A8 B5-A9
Round 7 A1-B7 A2-B8 B9-A3 B1-A4 B2-A5 B3-A6 A7-B4 A8-B5 A9-B6
Round 8 B8-A1 A2-B9 A3-B1 A4-B2 A5-B3 B4-A6 B5-A7 B6-A8 B7-A9
Round 9 A1-B9 B1-A2 B2-A3 B3-A4 B4-A5 A6-B5 A7-B6 A8-B7 A9-B8

Match on 10 Boards
Round  1  A1-B1  A2-B2  A3-B3  A4-B4  B5-A5  B6-A6  B7-A7  A8-B8  B9-A9  B10-A10
Round  2  B2-A1  B1-A2  B8-A3  B3-A4  A5-B10 A6-B5  A7-B6  B4-A8  A9-B7  A10-B9
Round  3  A1-B3  A2-B8  A3-B4  A4-B10 B6-A5  B7-A6  B9-A7  A8-B1  B2-A9  B5-A10
Round  4  B4-A1  B3-A2  B10-A3 A4-B6  A5-B7  B8-A6  A7-B5  A8-B9  B1-A9  A10-B2
Round  5  A1-B5  A2-B4  B9-A3  B7-A4  B1-A5  A6-B10 B8-A7  B2-A8  A9-B3  A10-B6
Round  6  B6-A1  A2-B7  A3-B1  A4-B9  A5-B8  A6-B2  B10-A7 B5-A8  B4-A9  B3-A10
Round  7  A1-B7  B5-A2  B2-A3  B1-A4  B4-A5  B9-A6  A7-B3  A8-B10 A9-B6  A10-B8
Round  8  B8-A1  B6-A2  A3-B5  A4-B2  A5-B9  A6-B1  A7-B4  B3-A8  B10-A9 B7-A10
Round  9  A1-B9  A2-B10 A3-B7  B5-A4  B2-A5  B3-A6  B1-A7  A8-B6  A9-B8  B4-A10
Round 10 B10-A1  B9-A2  B6-A3  B8-A4  A5-B3  A6-B4  A7-B2  B7-A8  A9-B5  A10-B1

Match on 11 Boards
Round  1 A1-B1  A2-B2  A3-B3  A4-B4  A5-B5  A6-B6  B7-A7  B8-A8  B9-A9  B10-A10 B11-A11
Round  2 B2-A1  B3-A2  B4-A3  B5-A4  B6-A5  A6-B7  A7-B8  A8-B9  A9-B10 A10-B11 B1-A11
Round  3 A1-B3  A2-B4  A3-B5  A4-B6  A5-B7  B8-A6  B9-A7  B10-A8 B11-A9 B1-A10  A11-B2
Round  4 B4-A1  B5-A2  B6-A3  B7-A4  A5-B8  A6-B9  A7-B10 A8-B11 A9-B1  B2-A10  B3-A11
Round  5 A1-B5  A2-B6  A3-B7  A4-B8  B9-A5  B10-A6 B11-A7 B1-A8  B2-A9  A10-B3  A11-B4
Round  6 B6-A1  B7-A2  B8-A3  A4-B9  A5-B10 A6-B11 A7-B1  A8-B2  B3-A9  B4-A10  B5-A11
Round  7 A1-B7  A2-B8  A3-B9  B10-A4 B11-A5 B1-A6  B2-A7  B3-A8  A9-B4  A10-B5  A11-B6
Round  8 B8-A1  B9-A2  A3-B10 A4-B11 A5-B1  A6-B2  A7-B3  B4-A8  B5-A9  B6-A10  B7-A11
Round  9 A1-B9  A2-B10 B11-A3 B1-A4  B2-A5  B3-A6  B4-A7  A8-B5  A9-B6  A10-B7  A11-B8
Round 10 B10-A1 A2-B11 A3-B1  A4-B2  A5-B3  A6-B4  B5-A7  B6-A8  B7-A9  B8-A10  B9-A11
Round 11 A1-B11 B1-A2  B2-A3  B3-A4  B4-A5  B5-A6  A7-B6  A8-B7  A9-B8  A10-B9  A11-B10

Match on 12 Boards
Round  1 A1-B1  A2-B2  A3-B3  A4-B4  A5-B5  A6-B6  B7-A7  B8-A8  B9-A9  B10-A10 B11-A11 B12-A12 
Round  2 B2-A1  B3-A2  B4-A3  B5-A4  B6-A5  B1-A6  A7-B8  A8-B9  A9-B10 A10-B11 A11-B12 A12-B7 
Round  3 A1-B3  A2-B4  A3-B5  A4-B6  A5-B1  A6-B2  B9-A7  B10-A8 B11-A9 B12-A10 B7-A11  B8-A12 
Round  4 B4-A1  B5-A2  B6-A3  B1-A4  B2-A5  B3-A6  A7-B10 A8-B11 A9-B12 A10-B7  A11-B8  A12-B9 
Round  5 A1-B5  A2-B6  A3-B1  A4-B2  A5-B3  A6-B4  B11-A7 B12-A8 B7-A9  B8-A10  B9-A11  B10-A12 
Round  6 B6-A1  B1-A2  B2-A3  B3-A4  B4-A5  B5-A6  A7-B12 A8-B7  A9-B8  A10-B9  A11-B10 A12-B11 
Round  7 A1-B7  A2-B8  A3-B9  A4-B10 A5-B11 A6-B12 B1-A7  B2-A8  B3-A9  B4-A10  B5-A11  B6-A12 
Round  8 B8-A1  B9-A2  B10-A3 B11-A4 B12-A5 B7-A6  A7-B2  A8-B3  A9-B4  A10-B5  A11-B6  A12-B1 
Round  9 A1-B9  A2-B10 A3-B11 A4-B12 A5-B7  A6-B8  B3-A7  B4-A8  B5-A9  B6-A10  B1-A11  B2-A12 
Round 10 B10-A1 B11-A2 B12-A3 B7-A4  B8-A5  B9-A6  A7-B4  A8-B5  A9-B6  A10-B1  A11-B2  A12-B3 
Round 11 A1-B11 A2-B12 A3-B7  A4-B8  A5-B9  A6-B10 B5-A7  B6-A8  B1-A9  B2-A10  B3-A11  B4-A12 
Round 12 B12-A1 B7-A2  B8-A3  B9-A4  B10-A5 B11-A6 A7-B6  A8-B1  A9-B2  A10-B3  A11-B4  A12-B5 

Match on 13 Boards
Round  1 A1-B1  A2-B2  A3-B3  A4-B4  A5-B5  A6-B6  A7-B7  B8-A8  B9-A9  B10-A10 B11-A11 B12-A12 B13-A13 
Round  2 B2-A1  B3-A2  B4-A3  B5-A4  B6-A5  B7-A6  A7-B8  A8-B9  A9-B10 A10-B11 A11-B12 A12-B13 B1-A13 
Round  3 A1-B3  A2-B4  A3-B5  A4-B6  A5-B7  A6-B8  B9-A7  B10-A8 B11-A9 B12-A10 B13-A11 B1-A12  A13-B2 
Round  4 B4-A1  B5-A2  B6-A3  B7-A4  B8-A5  A6-B9  A7-B10 A8-B11 A9-B12 A10-B13 A11-B1  B2-A12  B3-A13 
Round  5 A1-B5  A2-B6  A3-B7  A4-B8  A5-B9  B10-A6 B11-A7 B12-A8 B13-A9 B1-A10  B2-A11  A12-B3  A13-B4 
Round  6 B6-A1  B7-A2  B8-A3  B9-A4  A5-B10 A6-B11 A7-B12 A8-B13 A9-B1  A10-B2  B3-A11  B4-A12  B5-A13 
Round  7 A1-B7  A2-B8  A3-B9  A4-B10 B11-A5 B12-A6 B13-A7 B1-A8  B2-A9  B3-A10  A11-B4  A12-B5  A13-B6 
Round  8 B8-A1  B9-A2  B10-A3 A4-B11 A5-B12 A6-B13 A7-B1  A8-B2  A9-B3  B4-A10  B5-A11  B6-A12  B7-A13 
Round  9 A1-B9  A2-B10 A3-B11 B12-A4 B13-A5 B1-A6  B2-A7  B3-A8  B4-A9  A10-B5  A11-B6  A12-B7  A13-B8 
Round 10 B10-A1 B11-A2 A3-B12 A4-B13 A5-B1  A6-B2  A7-B3  A8-B4  B5-A9  B6-A10  B7-A11  B8-A12  B9-A13 
Round 11 A1-B11 A2-B12 B13-A3 B1-A4  B2-A5  B3-A6  B4-A7  B5-A8  A9-B6  A10-B7  A11-B8  A12-B9  A13-B10 
Round 12 B12-A1 A2-B13 A3-B1  A4-B2  A5-B3  A6-B4  A7-B5  B6-A8  B7-A9  B8-A10  B9-A11  B10-A12 B11-A13 
Round 13 A1-B13 B1-A2  B2-A3  B3-A4  B4-A5  B5-A6  B6-A7  A8-B7  A9-B8  A10-B9  A11-B10 A12-B11 A13-B12 

Note for all tables:

 In the n-th round the player A1 plays with the player Bn.

 Player A1 changes color in the next round.

 In the first round the player An plays with the player Bn.

See also
 Round-robin tournament

References

External links 
Scheveningen system tables

Tournament systems
Chess tournament systems
1923 in chess